Echinocorambe is a genus of sea slugs, dorid nudibranchs, shell-less marine gastropod mollusks in the family Akiodorididae.

Species 
 Echinocorambe brattegardi Valdés & Bouchet, 1998

References

Akiodorididae